Denise Yabut-Cojuangco (born 1 August 1961) is an equestrienne from the Philippines. Cojuangco represented the country in show jumping in the 1992 and 1996 Summer Olympics.

Career
Denise Cojuangco participated in the Summer Olympics twice; in 1992 and 1996 Summer Olympics. She competed in the individual Show jumping in equestrian. She rode two different horses; on Nimmerdor in the 1992 Games in Barcelona and on Chouman in the 1996 edition in Atlanta. In both occasions, she failed to progress in the final round.

Personal life
She is married to businessman Tonyboy Cojuangco, although they have been separated since 1994 when her estranged husband entered a relationship with actress Gretchen Barretto.

References 

1961 births
Living people
Filipino female equestrians
Olympic equestrians of the Philippines
Cojuangco family
People from Makati
Sportspeople from Metro Manila
Equestrians at the 1992 Summer Olympics
Equestrians at the 1996 Summer Olympics